White Van Man is a British sitcom that was created and was written by Adrian Poynton and first broadcast on BBC Three and BBC HD in 2011. It began screening in March 2011, becoming the highest-rated launch ever for a sitcom on BBC Three.

Will Mellor plays Ollie, a man who has to put his business dreams on hold while he takes over the family handyman business from his father, Tony, played by Clive Mantle. The series was filmed in and around Greater Manchester, including the Best Bet betting shop in Cheadle and Hollins DIY Store in Marple. A second series ran from 23 February to 29 March 2012.

BBC Three announced on 29 April 2012 that it had cancelled White Van Man. On 11 May 2012, it was announced that an American version of White Van Man, Family Tools, was picked up by ABC for a full series. Poynton served as its co-creator. Family Tools was canceled in 2013, after filming only 10 episodes.

Synopsis
White van man is colloquial for working class tradesmen in the UK.

Ollie (Will Mellor) takes over his father's handyman business in the (fictional) town of Maplebury in Northern England, which includes an old white 1997 Ford Transit and a dodgy assistant named Darren (Joel Fry), who displays little interest in working. Ollie is desperate to make his father proud, yet fails to bring in enough money. Emma (Georgia Tennant), who went to catering school with Ollie, has dreams of owning a restaurant. Liz (Naomi Bentley), Darren's sister, works in her uncle's local hardware store and is regularly visited by Ollie for supplies.

The series ends with Darren trying to get out of his marriage with Joanna, a woman that he got pregnant prior to events in the first episode. He is at the altar when he is saved by the police, who arrive to arrest Emma for insurance fraud.

Characters
Ollie "Rogan" Josh Curry – Will Mellor
Ollie reluctantly puts his dreams of running a restaurant on the back burner when his ailing father, Tony, turns to him to take over the family handyman business. Unfortunately for Ollie, the business comes complete with a dodgy van, some questionable tips and an even dodgier assistant, Darren. Ollie likes Emma and is oblivious to Liz's affections.
He was kicked out of his cooking courses for accidentally using drugs in his dish which he mistook for oregano. He has a strong sense of morality, which conflicts greatly with his clients, friends and family's views on the world.
Darren Brown – Joel Fry
Darren is Ollie's assistant in the handyman business. He is lazy, does not complete his tasks, and is the one getting Ollie into most of his troubles. Darren hates being locked in rooms and is very protective of his sister (especially when he finds out Ollie once slept with her).
He has serious commitment issues, and when he finds out he fathered Joanna's baby, he does everything he can to avoid her and her family (who are made up of criminals willing to beat him up if he doesn't marry Joanna).
Emma Keeley – Georgia Tennant
Emma is Ollie's old crush from catering school days. She is now a successful restaurateur, back in town looking to set up a new business. However, she is out of ideas for a new restaurant and, in desperation, starts taking ideas from Ollie. It is not certain whether her feelings are genuine for Ollie, as all she seems interested in is the business and the ideas that Ollie comes up with.
She has a deep hatred for Liz, as she is aware of Liz's feelings for Ollie. She is willing to commit underhanded deals to better her business.
Liz "Olizia" Brown – Naomi Bentley
Liz is Darren's sister who works behind the counter at the local hardware shop. She is one of Ollie's only true admirers, although he is unsure just how serious her affection is. It is revealed that she was training to become a community support officer, as she wanted to branch out from the hardware shop.
Tough and stubborn, she frequently uses innuendo with Ollie (sometimes without her even realising she's doing it) and is disappointed that he remains oblivious to them.
She has a deep hatred of Emma, disliking Emma's business-minded attitude to life, feeling that Ollie would be better off without Emma and with her instead.
Tony Curry – Clive Mantle
Tony used to be the local handyman. With recent illness leading him to early retirement, he turns to Ollie to take over the family business, Curry and Son. He is often critical of Ollie and his honest approach to the business, and it is shown that Tony often created some of the handyman jobs around the town by throwing stones at roofs, etc. Regardless, Tony is well-respected throughout Maplebury, and is often wanted by the client rather than Ollie.
Tony is shown to be violent when the situation calls for it. When OIllie stages a sit-in protest for a client who refuses to pay, Tony simply approaches the troublesome client and punches him in the face, taking the money off him.

At the end of series one, Tony has a heart attack, and after is constantly reminded by other characters to keep his blood-pressure down.
Ricky – Blake Harrison
Ricky is the local thief of Mapelbury. In episode one, he steals Ollie's sat-nav and in episode five he helps Ollie and Darren to break into the estate agents. He also asks Ollie to help move some stuff for his Nan, who fought in the war and has a hip replacement. However, Ollie believes this to be another of Ricky's scams and refuses, which annoys Ricky because he is actually telling the truth for once. In the final episode, Darren and Emma convince Ricky to steal from Ollie's office to save his business. Ricky attends Darren and Joanna's wedding. When the police arrive he is seen fleeing the scene.

Joanne – Vicky Longley
Joanne searches directory enquiries for the father of her baby who is "a handy man". In episode six, it is revealed that the baby's father is Darren, but Joanne isn't very bright and believes it is Ollie, although he has never met her before.
She is shown to have a short memory as she is constantly forgetting who Darren is. She is doted on by her father, a convicted criminal who regularly leaves the country to avoid parking tickets. He forces Darren to marry Joanna, and their wedding is stopped by the police, who arrive and arrest Emma. Joanna's father is recognised by the police and is tackled to the ground and placed under arrest.

Episodes

Series 1 (2011)

Series 2 (2012)

Viewers
Series one opened with a double-bill; episode 1 and 2 opened with 937,000 and 769,000 viewers respectively. The third took 881,000 viewers and the fourth got 937,000 viewers, roughly the same as the first episode. The last episode got 729,000 viewers.

Series two was broadcast on Thursday nights at 9:30pm, it had little advertising in the run up to the opening episode so didn't get as many viewers as the first series, although it did well in repeat viewings over the week and on the BBC iPlayer. The first series also had a later time slot.

DVD releases
The first series of White Van Man was released on 25 April 2011. The second series was released on 2 April 2012.

U.S. Version
In January 2012, a pilot for a US remake of the show was made starring Kyle Bornheimer, J. K. Simmons and Leah Remini in the main roles. On 11 May 2012 it was announced that ABC had picked up the remake (now called Family Tools) for a full series, which debuted 29 April 2013. This version is also produced by ITV through its US division in association with ABC Studios, with Poynton serving as one of its co-creators. On 10 May 2013, ABC cancelled Family Tools due to low ratings after it announced their US 2013–14 television season lineup.

References

External links

2010s British sitcoms
2011 British television series debuts
2012 British television series endings
BBC television sitcoms
English-language television shows
Television series by ITV Studios
Television shows set in Manchester